Ambrose Rogers is a Gaelic footballer for Down. He was captain in 2010 when Down played in the 2010 All-Ireland Senior Football Championship Final but Ambrose did not play because he was injured and missed the game and got the captaincy in 2012 again. It was a cruciate ligament injury. He did his cruciate in the quarter-final victory over Kerry. The door was kept open for him and he even tried a cryotherapy bath, going all the way to Tyrone for it, before they opened one in Newry for him. His efforts fell short.

An Ulster All-Star in 2010, he was paired with Dick Clerkin in midfield. He was part of the Match for Michaela.

References

Down inter-county Gaelic footballers
Year of birth missing (living people)
Living people